Ellipsocephalus Zenker, 1833, is a genus of blind Cambrian trilobite, comprising benthic species inhabiting deep, poorly lit or aphotic habitats. E. hoffi is a common trilobite mainly from central Europe (Czech Republic).

Distribution 
 E. hoffi (Schlotheim, 1823)  occurs in the Middle Cambrian of the Czech Republic, Jince Formation, Ellipsocephalus hoffi–Paradoxides (Rejkocephalus)–Lingulella Biozone of Fatka & Szabad (2014).
 E. polytomus Linnarsson, 1877, is widely distributed in the ‘Oelandicus Beds’ (Baltoparadoxides oelandicus Biosuperzone) of Sweden and found near Viken, Näkten lake, Närke and Jämtland. The species is also known from drill cores retrieved from the island of Gotland, Sweden (e.g., Ahlberg 1989).
 E. sanctacrucensis (Samsonowicz, 1959)  is known from the Middle Cambrian of Poland (Słowiec Sandstone Formation, Paradoxides insularis and P. pinus-zones, near Brzechów, Holy Cross Mountains).

Description 
Ellipsocephalus is approximately oval in shape and markedly convex. It has opistoparian facial sutures that are directed slightly outward from both front and back of the eyes. The glabella has approximately parallel, slightly concave sides and is rounded frontally. Lateral furrows are indiscernible, as is the occipital ring. The palpebral lobes are not distinctly separated from the narrow occular ridges. The preglabellar field is somewhat inflated and librigenae are half as wide as the fixigenae. Some species have genal spines (as in E. sanctacrucensis), whereas in the most common species (E. hoffi) the genae lack spines and are only slightly angular posterolaterally. Ellipsocephalus has 12 thoracic segments and the pygidium is 4× wider than long.

Behaviour 
Ellipsocephalus and some other primitive micropygous Cambrian genera, such as Bailiella, enroll differently from other trilobites so that the posterior thorax segments and pygidium bend under the thorax. This is called "double enrollment".

References

Sources 
 Trilobite info (Sam Gon III)

External links
 Trilobite info (Sam Gon III)

Ellipsocephalidae
Ptychopariida genera
Cambrian trilobites
Fossils of the Czech Republic
Paleozoic life of New Brunswick
Cambrian genus extinctions